The untitled seventh album by English industrial band Throbbing Gristle, also referred to as CD1, was released in 1986 through record label Mute.

Release 

The album is their first CD release and has a catalog number of "CD1", hence the adoption of the name. The album has been called "undoubtedly [...] in part responsible for the growing importance of the industrial scene in the late 1980s." The album is an TEAC 8-track recording done on 18 March 1979 at the band's Industrial Records Studio in Hackney, London.

Release 

CD1 was released in 1986 through record label Mute.

Critical reception 

Spin Alternative Record Guide called it "an album of meandering studio experiments".

Track listing

References 

Throbbing Gristle albums
1986 albums